The 2009 Brazilian Grand Prix (formally the Formula 1 Grande Prêmio Petrobras do Brasil 2009) was a Formula One motor race held at the Autódromo José Carlos Pace, São Paulo, Brazil on 18 October 2009. It was the sixteenth race of the 2009 Formula One World Championship.

The 71-lap race was won by Mark Webber, driving a Red Bull-Renault. Webber took his second victory of the season, and the second of his career, by 7.6 seconds from Robert Kubica in a BMW Sauber, with Lewis Hamilton third in a McLaren-Mercedes. Jenson Button finished fifth in his Brawn-Mercedes to secure his first and only Drivers' Championship, while Brawn GP sealed the Constructors' Championship.

Background
Local favourite Felipe Massa won the 2008 Brazilian Grand Prix for Ferrari as Lewis Hamilton picked up the World Championship for McLaren by overtaking Timo Glock on the last corner of the race for 5th. Massa also won the race in 2006, and was runner-up to teammate Kimi Räikkönen in 2007 as the Finn took the World Championship. The World title had been won at Interlagos for the previous 4 years, with Hamilton, Räikkönen and Fernando Alonso (twice) taking the title. Alonso has never won the Brazilian GP, however, with Juan Pablo Montoya and Massa winning the 2005 and 2006 races respectively. Another former Brazilian Grand Prix winner lining up was Giancarlo Fisichella, who won in 2003.

The race has a history of home success, with Massa, Ayrton Senna, Nelson Piquet Sr, Carlos Pace and Emerson Fittipaldi winning. Rubens Barrichello aimed for his first win at Interlagos, hoping to improve on his previous best placing of 3rd in 2004. Massa had targeted a return after injuries sustained in an accident in qualifying in the 2009 Hungarian Grand Prix, but this was not possible. Massa instead was given the honour of waving the chequered flag at the end of the race.

Championship leader Jenson Button needed to finish within four points of teammate Barrichello to seal the 2009 drivers' title. Red Bull's Sebastian Vettel needed to finish first or second in order to stay in the running for the title fight. In the constructors' standings, Brawn GP required just half a point to be declared champions, while Red Bull Racing needed to finish first and second in both Brazil and Abu Dhabi with Brawn not scoring in either round to take the title for themselves.

GP2 driver and Toyota test driver Kamui Kobayashi replaced Toyota's Timo Glock after tests revealed that he had cracked a vertebra in his qualifying accident at the previous race at Suzuka.

Qualifying report
Qualifying was dominated by a tropical storm that would interrupt the session for over an hour, and made the session last 2 hours and 41 minutes, the longest qualifying session in the history of F1. The first session saw the elimination of Giancarlo Fisichella, both McLaren cars and championship contender Sebastian Vettel; Nick Heidfeld joined them as the fifth and final car eliminated. The rains set in after the first session, delaying qualifying until the circuit could be declared safe. Nico Rosberg topped the timing sheets with a lap time of 1:22.828.

When the weather had cleared and the cars eventually re-emerged, Rosberg would once again come out on top. The session was almost immediately red-flagged with Vitantonio Liuzzi crashing heavily at the first corner. Unable to set a time, he was subsequently eliminated. Q2 also saw the elimination of championship leader Jenson Button down in fourteenth and behind Jaime Alguersuari, Kamui Kobayashi and Romain Grosjean, the three least-experienced drivers in the field.

For the first time since the knockout qualifying system was introduced, the third and final ten-minute session was contested by drivers from nine of the ten teams, the only exclusion being McLaren, with both Hamilton and Kovalainen having been knocked out in the first session; Williams were the only team to field two cars in the final session. Jenson Button's closest championship rival and teammate Rubens Barrichello took his first pole since the 2004 Brazilian Grand Prix at the same track, on a drying circuit with a 1:19.576, but the release of the post-qualifying car weights revealed him to be the lightest car on the grid. It would also be his final pole and also the last pole for his team.

Qualifying classification
Cars that use the KERS system are marked with "‡"

1. – Vitantonio Liuzzi received a five-place grid penalty for a gearbox change.

Race report
The opening lap was dominated by three separate incidents. Heikki Kovalainen made contact with Sebastian Vettel coming out of the Senna 'S', and while Vettel emerged unscathed, Kovalainen ran out of road and very nearly collected Fisichella, who was forced to go the long way around. The second incident took place just two corners later when Jarno Trulli tangled with Adrian Sutil while trying to make a pass coming out of the fifth corner. Both the Toyota and the Force India were eliminated, with Sutil taking out Fernando Alonso in the process when the Renault driver was unable to avoid his out-of-control Force India, an incident which caused the deployment of the safety car. The third and final incident took place in the pit lane; after his encounter with Vettel, Heikki Kovalainen pitted, followed closely by Kimi Räikkönen, the latter having damaged his front wing after light contact with Mark Webber. Kovalainen was released from his pit while the fuel hose was still attached, taking it with him and with it, a spray of fuel. Räikkönen's exhaust ignited the spilt fuel in a fireball, but no one was injured and both drivers were able to continue once Brawn mechanics extricated the McLaren fuel hose from Kovalainen's car.

Pole-sitter Barrichello controlled the first phase of the race, though Mark Webber and Robert Kubica stayed in touch, just two and a half seconds adrift. Aided by the first-lap incidents and the safety car, Button was placed ninth at the end of the first lap. He proceeded to take Grosjean around the outside at Turn 6 and then Nakajima at the first corner once green-flag conditions resumed, before being held up by debutant Kamui Kobayashi. He was heard on the team radio voicing his displeasure at the newcomer's tactics in defending his line. When he finally cleared the Toyota driver, Button was able to build a lead of three and a half seconds on him in a single lap.

Barrichello was unable to sustain the pace needed to maintain his lead over Webber, and in the first round of pit stops, the home town driver was passed by the Australian before coming under fire from Robert Kubica. Meanwhile, Lewis Hamilton — having started seventeenth — had pitted on the first lap and removed the softer tyre compound as his team switched him to a one-stop strategy. Other incidents early in the race saw Nick Heidfeld run out of fuel after his fuel-rig malfunctioned, whilst Kobayashi's blocking tactics removed fellow countryman Kazuki Nakajima's front wing, and the Williams driver crashed heavily at the fourth corner. His teammate Nico Rosberg had succumbed to gearbox troubles a few laps earlier.

The second stage of the race saw Button leading a group of four one-stopping drivers, with their ultimate success or failures having consequences on the championship standings given Barrichello's position. Both Hamilton and then Vettel successfully leap-frogged Button after Button's second stop and the Briton was caught behind Kovalainen, though a fading Rubens Barrichello was in a position such that had the race ended there and then, Button would still be declared World Champion. Button inherited sixth position when Kovalainen pitted, while Hamilton managed a pass down the inside of Barrichello into the first corner that inadvertently damaged the Brazilian's tyre, causing a puncture and forcing him to pit. He resumed in eighth, with Vettel's fourth placing meaning that, barring a dramatic turn in events, Button would be the 2009 World Champion even if he retired.

Mark Webber, who had led unchallenged since the first stops, went on to win the race, with Robert Kubica securing BMW Sauber's first podium since Malaysia. Lewis Hamilton's pass on Barrichello was good enough to net him third place and see McLaren overtake Ferrari for third in the constructors' standings. Sebastian Vettel was fourth when he needed to be first or second to continue the championship fight in Abu Dhabi, while Button's fifth place from fourteenth on the grid was enough for him to secure the 2009 World Championship, becoming the tenth British champion and the first British champion to succeed another since 1969, when Jackie Stewart succeeded Graham Hill as World Champion. He also became the second driver in succession to win a World Championship by finishing fifth in Brazil whilst driving a Mercedes-powered car carrying the number 22. Button used only one chassis over the course of the season (most drivers change chassis several times), having driven it in every practice and qualifying session and race, meaning that he won the World Championship in the oldest car on the grid. Kimi Räikkönen, Sebastien Buemi and Rubens Barrichello rounded out the minor points placings.

Felipe Massa was the chequered flag waver in this Grand Prix. The podium trophies were of an unusual three-pronged design and matt-turquoise in colour. They were designed by the architect Oscar Niemeyer and were constructed of recycled plastic bottle tops, collected on site over the course of the Grand Prix weekend, and remoulded at the site's plastic recycling plant. The initiative is to highlight sponsor Petrobras' green credentials.

Race classification

Cars that use the KERS system are marked with "‡"

2. – Heikki Kovalainen received a 25-second time penalty for an unsafe release from his first pit stop.

Championship standings after the race

Drivers' Championship standings

Constructors' Championship standings

 Note: Only the top five positions are included for both sets of standings.
 Bold text indicates the World Champions.

References

External links

 2009 Brazilian Grand Prix Preview

Brazilian Grand Prix
Brazilian Grand Prix
Brazilian Grand Prix
Brazilian Grand Prix